Miss Israel is a national beauty pageant in Israel. The pageant was founded in 1950, where the winners were sent to Miss Universe. The pageant was also existing to send delegates to Miss World, Miss International, Miss Europe and Miss Asia Pacific International. The 1976 competition was held in International Convention Center, Jerusalem, and had 25 contestants. Rina Mor was the winner.

Results

External links
Miss Israel 1976 (hebrew)

1976 beauty pageants
1976 in Israel
Miss Israel
1970s in Jerusalem

fr:Miss Israël 1976